Antony Michael Partos (born 1 August 1968) is an Australian film and TV composer. He specialises in creating scores that blend both acoustic and electronic elements with a mix of world musical instruments. His feature film credits include Animal Kingdom (AFI Award for Best Feature Score) The Rover, Disgrace, The Home Song Stories (AFI Award for best feature score) and Unfinished Sky (AFI Award for best feature score).

His scores for TV dramas include The Slap (AGSC Award for Best TV Theme), Mabo (AGSC Award for Best Telemovie Score), Rake (AGSC Award for best music in a TV Series and best song for a TV drama), Redfern Now (AACTA Award for best music score in television and best song for a TV drama).

Other projects include the United States feature film, 99 Homes, the award-winning score for the feature film Tanna (AACTA and Film Critics Circle Award), the feature documentary Sherpa (winner of the AGSC as well as AACTA award for best music for a documentary) alongside the drama series Love Child, Janet King and Jack Irish.

In 2015 Partos was the Vice-President of the Australian Guild of Screen Composers (AGSC).

Early life 

Antony Partos studied Piano, Horn and Composition at The Sydney Conservatorium High School from 1980 to 1986. In 1987 he was accepted into the Australian Film, Television and Radio School. He completed a Bachelor of Arts in Film and Television, majoring in sound in 1991. In 1994 he formed the music production house, Supersonic, with composers Andrew Lancaster and Paul Healy, at Minton House in Sydney's Kings Cross. In 2010 Supersonic closed, and he and Lancaster formed the music production house, Sonar Music, at Fox Studios Australia in Moore Park, New South Wales.

Personal life 

Antony Michael Partos' parents are Andrew Partos (born 1930) and Robin Partos (1938–2006) and his sister was Vanessa Partos (1970–1989). Partos' partner is Rebecca Gregg, they have two children.

Awards and nominations

AFI / AACTA Awards 

Wins

Nominations

ARIA Music Awards

The ARIA Music Awards is an annual awards ceremony that recognises excellence, innovation, and achievement across all genres of the music of Australia.

! Reference
|-
| 2020
| Mystery Road (with Matteo Zingales)
| Best Original Soundtrack, Cast or Show Album
| 
|
|-
|2021 || Rams || Best Original Soundtrack, Cast or Show Album ||  || 
|-

References

External links
 

APRA Award winners
Australian composers
1968 births
Living people